Saprosecans is a genus of mites in the family Halolaelapidae. There are at least two described species in Saprosecans.

Species
These two species belong to the genus Saprosecans:
 Saprosecans baloghi Karg, 1964
 Saprosecans bialoviensis Gwiazdowicz, 2001

References

Mesostigmata
Articles created by Qbugbot